Old Ripley is a village in Bond County, Illinois, United States. The population was 82 at the 2020 census.

History
Old Ripley was once called New Berlin and was then called Ripley. Old Ripley was incorporated as a village in 1906.

Geography

Demographics

As of the 2020 census there were 82 people, 30 households, and 24 families residing in the village. The racial makeup of the village was 96.34% White, and 3.66% from two or more races. None of the population was Hispanic or Latino.

There were 30 households, out of which 53.33% had children under the age of 18 living with them, 56.67% were married couples living together, and 20.00% were non-families. 20.00% of all households were made up of individuals, and 6.67% had someone living alone who was 65 years of age or older. The average household size was 2.96 and the average family size was 2.63.

The village's age distribution consisted of 20.3% under the age of 18, 1.3% from 18 to 24, 45.6% from 25 to 44, 17.8% from 45 to 64, and 15.2% who were 65 years of age or older. The median age was 30.9 years. For every 100 females, there were 119.4 males. For every 100 females age 18 and over, there were 110.0 males.

The median income for a household in the village was $69,167, and the median income for a family was $73,214. Males had a median income of $43,750 versus $28,750 for females. The per capita income for the village was $24,977. None of the population was below the poverty line.

References

Villages in Bond County, Illinois
Villages in Illinois
Populated places established in 1906
1906 establishments in Illinois